Westwood Secondary School (WWSS) is a co-educational government secondary school in Jurong West, Singapore.

It was founded on 2 January 2000, the integrated government school offers secondary education under three academic streams, which lead up to the Singapore-Cambridge GCE Ordinary Level or the Singapore-Cambridge GCE Normal Level examination.

History
Westwood Secondary School was founded in 2000 in the new residential town of Jurong West. Initially, it was housed in Huayi Secondary, before it moved to its current location at Jurong West Street 25 on 4 December 2000.

References

External links
 Official website

Secondary schools in Singapore
Jurong West
Educational institutions established in 2000
2000 establishments in Singapore